Judy Tyler (born Judith Mae Hess; October 9, 1932 – July 3, 1957) was an American singer and actress.

Early life and career

Judy Tyler spent her teen years in Teaneck, New Jersey. She came from a show business family and was encouraged to study dance and acting. Tyler's acting career began as a teenager, with regular appearances on Howdy Doody as Princess Summerfall Winterspring from 1950 to 1953.

Like her mother, Tyler became a chorus girl, and then landed a starring role in the Rodgers and Hammerstein musical Pipe Dream. Life did a story on rising Broadway talent with Tyler on its cover as one of the up-and-coming stars. Tyler lived with her parents in Teaneck while appearing on Howdy Doody and Broadway.

Offered an opportunity in Hollywood, Tyler appeared in the film Bop Girl Goes Calypso (1957), then starred opposite Elvis Presley in Jailhouse Rock (1957). She made a guest appearance on Perry Mason as Irene Kilby in "The Case of the Fan Dancer's Horse", which aired on December 28, 1957, nearly six months after her death.

Death
After filming Jailhouse Rock, Tyler and her second husband, Gregory Lafayette (born Earl Gregory Nisonger Jr.), began driving home to New York from Hollywood. While driving through Wyoming on July 3, 1957, they were involved in an automobile accident on U.S. Route 287 near Rock River. Tyler was killed instantly, aged 24, and Lafayette died the next day, aged 19. The Casper Morning Star reported the passenger killed in the oncoming car, driven by Paul Reed, was Don D. Jones, 23, of Hanna, Wyoming. Police said Lafayette swerved to avoid hitting a car that was towing a trailer and collided with the other vehicle involved in the crash. Reporter Ted Smith wrote in The Commercial Appeal that the trailer-towing car was returning to the highway after leaving a tourist shop.

Filmography

References

External links

1932 births
1957 deaths
American film actresses
American television actresses
Actresses from Milwaukee
People from Teaneck, New Jersey
Road incident deaths in Wyoming
People from Shorewood, Wisconsin
20th-century American actresses
20th-century American musicians